Syzygium pauper is a species of plant in the family Myrtaceae. It is found in Malaysia and Singapore.

References

pauper
Taxonomy articles created by Polbot
Taxobox binomials not recognized by IUCN